Eks Libris is a weekly satirical comic strip with stories from the literary world that is published in the Danish newspaper Weekendavisen'''s literary supplement Bøger. It is written by Frank Madsen and drawn by Sussi Bech. It was from September 2009 to October 2010 co-written by Mette Finderup. The newspaper strips is published annually in booklets by Forlaget Eudor.

Characters
Characters include the writer  Finn Sysholm, the poet Sune Lynder, two librarians, two booksellers and a group of editors from the fictional publishing house Buch Binders. A number of real people have also made guest appearances in the comic strip, including authors Ib Michael, Klaus Rifbjerg and Minister of Culture Per Stig Møller.

Publication
The comic strips from Weekendavisen'' has been published in booklets by Forlaget Eudor:
 Eks Libris 1: Problemer med Carsten Jensen-robotten i Zone 7!
 Eks Libris 2: Tænk på signalværdien!
 Eks Libris 3: Jyderne er mægtig flinke… men stille!
 Eks Libris 4: Lotte går til parterapi!
 Eks Libris 5: Zenia Nyker genopliver Kulturrrrradikalismen
 Eks Libris 6: Finn Sysholm går i sort!
 Eks Libris 7: Bob Dylan svarer ikke
 Eks Libris 8: Dr. Lidegaard og Mr. Hyde

References

External links
 Ekslibris.dk
 Eks Libris
 Publisher's site with samples in English/French

Danish comic strips
Weekendavisen